Plamen Petkov (born 1 September 1959) is a Bulgarian gymnast. He competed in eight events at the 1980 Summer Olympics.

References

1959 births
Living people
Bulgarian male artistic gymnasts
Olympic gymnasts of Bulgaria
Gymnasts at the 1980 Summer Olympics
European champions in gymnastics
Place of birth missing (living people)